Maureen Kamene Kimenye Mariita, commonly known as Maureen Kimenye, is a Kenyan physician and medical administrator, who serves as the Head of the National Tuberculosis, Leprosy & Lung Disease Control Programme, in the Kenyan Ministry of Health.

Background and education
She was born in Kenya, . After attending local primary and secondary schools, she was admitted to Moi University School of Medicine, where she obtained her Bachelor of Medicine and Bachelor of Surgery degree.

She studied at The Research Institute of Tuberculosis, Japan, graduating with a Diploma in Tuberculosis Epidemiology and Control. She also holds a Diploma in Project Management, obtained from the Kenya Institute of Management, in Nairobi, Kenya. She then spent one year in a fellowship program, studying multiple drug resistant strains of tuberculosis and HIV/AIDS in Lesotho, Southern Africa. Her Master of Business Administration degree was awarded by the University of Nicosia in Cyprus.

Career
Maureen Kimenye is a leading authority in the treatment and control of tuberculosis in Sub-Saharan Africa. She oversaw the development of a mobile computer application, Tibu, which allows doctors to track records of over 550,000 tuberculosis patients in Kenya. She has helped Namibia and Ethiopia replicate the application.

She has a passion for teaching and is responsible for the education of over 1,000 people about how to treat tuberculosis. Using teleconferencing, she helps experts teach classes on tuberculosis. Some callers join with 15 or 30 other individuals within the call. The application known as TB Echo, can host as many as 4,500 callers, simultaneously.

Other considerations
In September 2018, Business Daily Africa, a Kenyan, English language, daily newspaper, named Dr. Maureen Kimenye, among the "Top 40 Under 40 Women in Kenya in 2018".

See also
 Borna Nyaoke-Anoke
 Shitsama Nyamweya
 Catherine Nyongesa

References

External links
One-on-One with Dr Kamene Kimenye - Mariita on Project ECHO in Kenya

1983 births
Living people
Kenyan pulmonologists
Kenyan women physicians
Moi University alumni
University of Nicosia alumni